This is a list of Canadian films which were released in 1993:

See also
 1993 in Canada
 1993 in Canadian television

External links
Feature Films Released In 1993 With Country of Origin Canada at IMDb

1993
1993 in Canadian cinema
Canada